Hope for the Hopeless is the third studio album by the American singer-songwriter Brett Dennen. It was released on October 21, 2008, following Dennen's tour of Australia. The Nigerian Afro-beat musician Femi Kuti appears on the album's first single, "Make You Crazy". The album peaked at number 41 on the Billboard 200 album chart, and number 4 on Billboard's Top Independent Albums chart.

Referring to "Make You Crazy", Dennen told Rolling Stone: "I made the song catchy but it's about all the injustice in the world." That song has a music video starring the American singer Mandy Moore. "Heaven" was the second single released from this album and Dennen decided to sell it also on iTunes. Natalie Merchant, the former leading singer of 10,000 Maniacs rock band, appears on this single.

Critical response
Hope for the Hopeless received a score of 71 on Metacritic, which collated reviews from Entertainment Weekly, Allmusic, Popmatters, Paste, Billboard and Rolling Stone. The most favourable review came from Entertainment Weekly's Leah Greenblatt, who hailed the albums "tuneful folk-rock accessibility" before giving it a final rating of B+. Dennen's songwriting was held up to scrutiny by, among others, Popmatters''' Aarik Danielsen, who said, in a 7/10 review, "...he’s no Dylan or Lennon, but he does capture the spirit of a generation attracted to the hopeful promise they witnessed in the Obama candidacy."

Track listing

Personnel
The following people contributed to Hope for the Hopeless.
Brett Dennen - guitar, vocals
John Alagia - guitar, piano, backing vocals, production
Tom Freund - Backing vocals
Mark Goldenberg - guitar
Missy Higgins - backing vocals
Sean Hurley - bass guitar
Femi Kuti - backing vocals
Zac Rae - keyboards, ukulele
Joey Waronker - percussion, drums
Natalie Merchant - vocals

References

2008 albums
Brett Dennen albums